Released Upon the Earth is the fourth album of the thrash metal band, Vengeance Rising. The album was later re-released in 2015, remastered and expanded. The only official members of the band at this point were founder Roger Martinez and new drummer Johnny Vasquez, who would later play with Mortification, when they first came to America, Tooth n’ Nail recording artists The Blamed (21 album tour), and Time Spent Burning  Alongside Vasquez, on this album, Steve Rowe performed guest vocals on the track "Tion"

.

Critical reception

Dave Williams wrote "...musically, they are really not in the same league as our own home grown Seventh Angel and Detritus. I think in this case the Americans need to take a lesson from the inventors of metal music - the British." Classic Thrash reports "In all honesty, Released Upon The Earth may be far from perfection, but for some reason it is the Vengeance Rising release that has got the most spins from me so far." The magazine, Heaven's Metal also did a review of the album, written by Doug Van Pelt.

Track listing

Personnel
Vengeance Rising 
 Roger Martinez - vocals, guitar
 Johnny Vasquez - drums
 Victor Macias (Tourniquet)- bass
 Jamie Mitchell (Scattered Few)- guitar 
 Jimmy Brown (Deliverance) - rhythm guitar
 (Touring Band):
 Daniel Cordoba - rhythm guitar 
 Mike Wagel - bass
 George Ochoa (Deliverance/Recon)- guitar
 Johnny Vasquez drums
 Roger Martinez - vocals

Additional musicians
 Gordon Martinez - backing vocals
 David Fuentes - backing vocals
 David Vasquez - backing vocals
 Michael Kramer - backing vocals
 David Portillo - backing vocals
 Simon Dawg - guitars
 Steve Rowe - additional vocals on "Tion"
 Jamie Mitchell - lead guitars
 Joe Monsorb'nik - bass guitar

Production
 Ed McTaggart - art direction
 Joe Potter - design
 George Ochoa - engineering, mixing 
 John Matousek - mastering
 Thom Roy - second engineer
 Roger Mike - second engineer
 Pat Woehl - engineering
 Gil Morales - drum tracking engineer
 Andre Pavalotos - drum tech

References

1992 albums
Vengeance Rising albums
Frontline Records albums